The Danagla ("People of Dongola") are a tribe in northern Sudan of partial Arab descent, primarily settling between the third Nile cataract and al Dabbah. Along with Kenzi, Fadicca, Halfawi, Sikot, and Mahas, they form a significant part of the Sudanese Arabs. In addition, they have historically lived in proximity to their Shaigiya and Ja'alin neighbors. They speak Sudanese Arabic, although the Nubian language of Dongolawi was spoken in northern Sudan. It is still spoken by a minority of the population alongside the Sudanese Arabic dialect.

Genetics 
According to Y-DNA analysis by Hassan et al (2008), around 44% of Nubians and Danaglas generally in Sudan carry the haplogroup J in individually varied but rather small percentages. The remainder mainly belong to the E1b1b clade (23%). Both paternal lineages are also common among local Afroasiatic-speaking populations.

Notes

Literature
 
 
 

Ja'alin tribe

Arabs in Sudan
Tribes of Sudan